Ninovka is a rural locality (a selo) in Ikryaninsky District, Astrakhan Oblast, Russia. The population was 668 as of 2010. There are 8 streets.

Geography 
Ninovka is located 32 km south of Ikryanoye (the district's administrative centre) by road. Fyodorovka is the nearest rural locality.

References 

Rural localities in Ikryaninsky District